Johnson is a populated place situated in Cochise County, Arizona, United States, on the east side of the Little Dragoon Mountains.

History
The location began as a mining camp, and a post office was established there in 1900, with William De H. Washington as its postmaster. The post office closed in 1929.

Johnson's population was 317 in 1902.

References

Populated places in Cochise County, Arizona